Jayanta Talukdar (born 2 March 1986 in Guwahati) is an Indian archer. He has won individual gold Medal in the 2006 Archery World Cup.

Career
Talukdar was part of the Indian team that won the silver medal at the 2004 Junior World Championships. He followed up with a gold medal at the FITA Meteksan World Cup in 2006, becoming the first Indian archer (bhartiya tirandaj) to win gold at the event. In 2006 he also won a gold medal at the South Asian Games and a bronze medal in the team competition at the 2006 Asian Games.

Despite losses in 2009, the Tata Steel sponsored Talukdar was seeded Number 1 for the 2009 World Cup in Copenhagen.

On 21 June 2012, Jayanta Talukdar made it to the Indian men's recurve archers team for London Olympics 2012, he competed in both the men's individual and the men's team events.  He lost to Jacob Wukie in the first round of the individual event, and India lost to Japan in the first round of the team event.

In November, 2015, he won Bronze medal in the 2015 Asian Archery Championships with Deepika Kumari in the Recurve Mixed Team event.

Tokyo Olympics 
He is most probably in for the Tokyo 2021 Olympic Games.

Awards 

Jayanta was awarded the Arjuna Award in archery in August, 2006.

References

Living people
1986 births
Indian male archers
Recipients of the Arjuna Award
Sportspeople from Guwahati
Commonwealth Games bronze medallists for India
Sportspeople from Assam
Asian Games medalists in archery
Olympic archers of India
Archers at the 2012 Summer Olympics
Archers at the 2006 Asian Games
Archers at the 2010 Asian Games
Archers at the 2014 Asian Games
Asian Games bronze medalists for India
Commonwealth Games medallists in archery
Medalists at the 2006 Asian Games
Medalists at the 2010 Asian Games
Archers at the 2010 Commonwealth Games
South Asian Games gold medalists for India
South Asian Games medalists in archery
Medallists at the 2010 Commonwealth Games